Events in the year 1961 in Spain.

Incumbents
Caudillo: Francisco Franco

Births

June 18 - Manuel Pereira.
July 23 - Gonzalo Arconada Echarri.
November 4 - Carlos García Cantarero.
December 24 - Silvia Fontana.

Deaths

April 7 – Jesús Guridi, Spanish Basque composer (b. 1886)
 April 19 – Manuel Quiroga, Spanish violinist (b. 1892)
 August 1 – Domingo Pérez Cáceres, Spanish Roman Catholic priest and saint (b. 1892)
 Miguel Gómez Bao  –  Spanish-born Argentine actor (b. 1894)
 December 23 – Fanny Schoonheyt, Dutch Communist Lieutenant in the Spanish Civil War. (b. 1912)

See also
 1961 in Spanish television
 List of Spanish films of 1961

References

 
Years of the 20th century in Spain
1960s in Spain
Spain
Spain